Kyle Vogt is an American engineer, entrepreneur, technology executive and robotics pioneer. In 2013, Vogt founded Cruise Automation, where he currently serves as the company's President, Chief Executive Officer and Chief Technology Officer. Cruise develops self-driving car technology and, since being acquired in May 2016, operates as an independent subsidiary of General Motors. Vogt and Cruise Co-Founder Dan Kan are the youngest senior directors at GM. Vogt and Kan were listed as number 7 on Fortune's 2016 40 Under 40 List, an annual ranking of the most influential young people in business.

Early life
Vogt, a native of Kansas City, Kansas, has been passionate about the concept of autonomous driving since his teenage years. Growing up in suburban Johnson County, Kansas, Vogt attended public schools in the Olathe and Shawnee Mission school districts. In 2004, he graduated from Shawnee Mission Northwest High School. He studied computer science and electrical engineering as an undergraduate student at the Massachusetts Institute of Technology. While there, Vogt participated in the 2004 DARPA Grand Challenge, a seminal event that many key players in the autonomous vehicle space credited with spurring the development of technology fundamental to self-driving cars. Also while he was at MIT, Vogt interned at Roomba-maker iRobot and competed in two seasons of BattleBots.

Justin.tv and other ventures
Vogt left MIT during his Junior year to take a job with the team that would go on to form Justin.tv and Twitch. A Co-Founder at Justin.tv, Vogt was later described as the "creative genius" at the start-up, who "hero-coded" the company out of problems and designed the camera systems necessary for live streaming. As reported in Fortune, according to Justin.tv co-founder Justin Kan, Vogt would "just, like, lock himself in a room for three days and code away and then emerge with something that worked." Justin Kan's younger brother and future co-founder of Cruise, Dan Kan, spent a summer interning at Justin.tv.

In June 2011, Vogt became co-founder at both Socialcam and Twitch, both of which were acquired, Socialcam for $60 million and Twitch by Amazon in a deal for $970 million.

Cruise Automation 
Following his departure from Twitch, Vogt turned to autonomous vehicles and founded Cruise Automation in October 2013 as President and Chief Technology Officer. Early on, the company participated in Y Combinator, a startup accelerator that mentors up-and-coming entrepreneurs. Cruise was acquired by General Motors in March 2016, reportedly for over $1 billion. In December 2021, after Cruise CEO Dan Ammann left the company, Vogt became interim CEO until February 2022 when he became CEO, maintaining his CTO and President titles.

References

External links
 

Year of birth missing (living people)
Living people
MIT School of Engineering alumni
American company founders